Calgary Victoria Park was a provincial electoral district in Calgary, Alberta, Canada, mandated to return a single member to the Legislative Assembly of Alberta using the first past the post method of voting from 1967 to 1971.

The riding existed for four years and would be contested once for the 1967 election. After which the Alberta Legislature passed the 1970 An Act to amend The Election Act and The Legislative Assembly Act to redraw provincial electoral districts. Calgary Centre and Calgary Victoria Park were split between Calgary-Buffalo, Calgary-Mountain View, Calgary-Bow, Calgary-Millican and Calgary-North Hill.

The riding was named after the community of Victoria Park.

Election Results 1967

See also
List of Alberta provincial electoral districts

References

Further reading

External links
Elections Alberta
The Legislative Assembly of Alberta

Former provincial electoral districts of Alberta
Politics of Calgary